Stunts (2007) is the debut full-length (and fourth overall) release by the indie rock band Rademacher.

Track listing
All songs written by Rademacher.

"Arkansas" - 5:19
"Not My Home" - 2:57
"Machines" - 3:09
"If U Got Some Magic" - 4:04
"What Yr Used To Back At Home" - 4:51
"On Yr Marks" - 3:07
"Today is Different" - 3:17
"Stunts" - 2:53
"Letter From Fresno, CA" - 4:17

References

Rademacher (band) albums
2007 debut albums